Abū al-ʿAbbās Aḥmad ibn ʿAlī al-Najāshī (c. 982–1058), often simply referred to as al-Najāshī, was a Twelver Shi'ite scholar mainly known for his work on the subject of biographical evaluation (Islamic science dealing with the reliability of hadith transmitters), called the .

See also

 Muhammad ibn Umar al-Kashshi, and his

References

External links 

 Ahmad b. 'Ali al-Najashi

980s births
1058 deaths
Writers from Baghdad
11th-century writers
Shia Islamists
11th-century Muslim scholars of Islam
Biographical evaluation scholars